Xavier "Xavi" Carmona Velasco (born 21 January 1993) is a Spanish footballer who plays for UE Engordany as a right back.

Football career
Born in Santa Coloma de Gramenet, Barcelona, Catalonia, Carmona graduated with Real Madrid's youth ranks, after a spell with fierce rivals FC Barcelona. He made his senior debuts with the C-team in the 2011–12 campaign, in Tercera División.

In August 2012 Carmona was loaned to Madrid neighbours CD Leganés, in Segunda División B. However, after appearing sparingly he joined Real Valladolid B on 15 July 2013.

Carmona played his first match as a professional on 10 September 2014, playing the full 90 minutes in a 3–1 away win over Sporting de Gijón for the season's Copa del Rey. He made his Segunda División debut on 7 June of the following year, starting in a 2–4 home loss against UE Llagostera.

On 19 June 2015 Carmona signed a one-year deal with another reserve team, UD Almería B also in the third division. On 29 January of the following year he moved to fellow league team Cádiz CF, achieving promotion to the second level at the end of the campaign.

On 3 August 2016, Carmona was loaned to Barakaldo CF in a season-long deal. In September, however, his loan was cut short, and he was subsequently released by Cádiz.

Carmona subsequently spent the following two campaigns in the lower leagues, representing CF Montañesa, Unionistas de Salamanca CF and UD Los Barrios before moving abroad and joining Gibraltar United FC in August 2018.

References

External links

1993 births
Living people
People from Santa Coloma de Gramenet
Sportspeople from the Province of Barcelona
Spanish footballers
Spanish expatriate footballers
Footballers from Catalonia
Association football defenders
Segunda División players
Segunda División B players
Tercera División players
Real Madrid C footballers
CD Leganés players
Real Valladolid Promesas players
Real Valladolid players
UD Almería B players
Cádiz CF players
Barakaldo CF footballers
CF Montañesa players
Unionistas de Salamanca CF players
Gibraltar United F.C. players
Spanish expatriate sportspeople in Gibraltar
Expatriate footballers in Gibraltar